Higurashi When They Cry is a Japanese anime television series based on Ryukishi07's visual novel series. The English titles for the first season are accorded to the titles used by Funimation. English titles in the other seasons are not official.

The first season titled . It was animated by Studio Deen, and produced by Frontier Works, Geneon Entertainment and Sotsu. The series was directed by Chiaki Kon, with Toshifumi Kawase handling series composition, Kyūta Sakai designing the characters and Kenji Kawai composing the music. It was released in English by Geneon and Funimation, under the title When They Cry – Higurashi no Naku Koro ni. The first season contains 26 episodes and aired from April 4 to September 26, 2006 on a number of television networks, including Chiba TV, Kansai TV and Tokai TV. The story follows five friends solving the case about unexplained murders occurred for three years in the village. The series is divided into six chapters which are based on the first six chapters in the original visual novel series. The first chapter is Onikakushi-hen (episodes 1 to 4), followed by Watanagashi-hen (episodes 5 to 8), and Tatarigoroshi-hen (episodes 9 to 13). Next is Himatsubushi-hen (episodes 14 and 15), the shortest of the story arcs. The last two chapters are Meakashi-hen (episodes 16 to 21) and Tsumihoroboshi-hen (episodes 22 through 26). An extra episode based on a short story written by Ryukishi07, was released in Japan for the first season on July 27, 2007 as a bonus for purchasing all nine anime DVD volumes. The OVA includes opening and ending animations from the first season, but features Sakai's updated character designs from the second season.

The second season is titled . It was produced by the same team and contains 24 episodes. The series aired in Japan between July 6 and December 17, 2007 on several television networks, such as Sun Television, TV Kanagawa and TV Saitama. The story continues what is left unexplained in the first season over the course of three separate story arcs. The first story is an anime-original arc called Yakusamashi-hen, which is followed by the last two arcs from the original visual novel series: Minagoroshi-hen and Matsuribayashi-hen. On September 18, 2007, a sixteen-year-old girl killed her father with an axe in Kyoto, Japan. The similarities between Kai and the incident were too strong. In response, Tokai TV replaced episode twelve on September 21, 2007 with a cooking show.

A five-episode original video animation (OVA) series, titled , was released from February 25 to August 21, 2009. Kawase takes over Kon's role as director, while Kazuya Kuroda takes over Sakai's role as character designer. It has two arcs taken from the fan disc of the same name and another arc adapted from a light novel released with the PlayStation version. Another four-episode OVA series to celebrate the 10th anniversary of the Higurashi franchise, titled , was released from July 21, 2011 to January 25, 2012. Tomoyuki Abe took over Kuroda's role as character designer. The OVA film  was adapted from the short story "Higurashi Outbreak", and was released on August 15, 2013. Sakai, who served as character designer for the first two seasons, returns for this OVA.

A new anime series, titled , is animated by Passione and directed by Keiichiro Kawaguchi, with Takashi Ikehata serving as assistant director, Naoki Hayashi handling series composition, Akio Watanabe designing the characters and Kawai returning as music composer. The main cast will reprise their roles. The series was set premiere in July 2020, but was delayed to October 2020 due to the COVID-19 pandemic.  It aired from October 1, 2020 to March 19, 2021. Funimation acquired the series and was streamed on the website in North America and the British Isles, and on AnimeLab in Australia and New Zealand. In Southeast Asia and South Asia, Medialink has acquired the series and is streaming the series on its YouTube channel Ani-One. The series ran for 24 episodes. The second season, aired from July 1 to September 30, 2021 with 15 episodes.

Series overview

Episode list

When They Cry (2006)

Higurashi no Naku Koro ni: Nekogoroshi-hen (2007)

When They Cry: Kai (2007)

When They Cry: Rei (2009)

Higurashi no Naku Koro ni Kira (2011–12)

Higurashi no Naku Koro ni Kaku: Outbreak (2013)

Higurashi: When They Cry – Gou (2020–21)

Higurashi: When They Cry – Sotsu (2021)

Notes

References
General

Specific

External links
Anime official website 
Higurashi When They Cry - Gou official website 

Episodes
Higurashi When They Cry